Medbury is a rural locality in the Canterbury region of New Zealand's South Island.  It is located just off State Highway 7 near the Hurunui River.  There is no longer a significant population base forming a township, just rural properties.

On 15 December 1884, an extension of the railway line that ran to Waikari was opened to Medbury, and it remained the terminus for a little over a year before another extension was opened, this one to Culverden, on 8 February 1886.  This line was envisaged as becoming the Main North Line to Nelson and Blenheim, but instead, a coastal route via Parnassus and Kaikoura was chosen.  The line through Medbury had its furthest terminus in Waiau and it became known as the Waiau Branch.  Medbury station had a loading bank, stockyards, and a water tank for steam locomotives, and a goods shed was installed in 1924.  The station was closed due to low traffic in 1974, with the line's closure taking place on 15 January 1978.  The goods shed still stands, relocated to a farmer's paddock. Paul Protheroe - my grandmother Neillie Macleod, formally Brooker was brought up in this area at the end of the 19th/early 20th century. The Brooker family were prominent in the area at that time and were stationed in Medbury, on a farm.

External links
Information about and photos of Medbury's railway station

Hurunui District
Populated places in Canterbury, New Zealand